Thyrgis ruscia is a moth of the subfamily Arctiinae. It was described by Herbert Druce in 1895. It is found in Bolivia and Ecuador.

Subspecies
Thyrgis ruscia ruscia (Bolivia)
Thyrgis ruscia phlegon (H. Druce, 1885) (Ecuador)

References

 

Arctiinae
Moths described in 1895